The Australia–New Zealand soccer rivalry is a soccer rivalry between the Australian men's and women's vs. New Zealand men's and women's national teams. It is part of a wider friendly trans-Tasman rivalry between geographical neighbours Australia and New Zealand in a range of sports including cricket, rugby league, rugby union and netball. Due to the countries' similar histories, language, and cultural and sporting interests, this wider rivalry is frequently referred to in the press as analogous to a sibling rivalry. The rivalry was more intense when Australia and New Zealand were both members of the Oceania Football Confederation and regularly contested finals of the OFC Nations Cup and for top position in OFC World Cup Qualification campaigns. The rivalry has been less frequent since Australia left the OFC to join the Asian Football Confederation in 2006. In 2022, Football Australia and New Zealand Football planned a home and away series, to mark the 100th anniversary of the first meeting between the two nations, which was first played in Dunedin back in 1922.

History

Men's

Both Australia and New Zealand's first official internationals were played against each other during the Australian 1922 tour of New Zealand. They played three matches at Carisbrook in Dunedin, Athletic Park in Wellington, and Auckland Domain. The results were two 3–1 wins to New Zealand and a 1–1 draw in Wellington. New Zealand would go on to win four of the first six matches with Australia picking up one win in the first game between the teams in Australia.

Australia and New Zealand would become regular opponents in exhibition matches for the next 36 years, with the trans-Tasman neighbours playing each other on 21 occasions in seven test series during that time period. This included Australia's largest victory over their rivals with a 10–0 win in 1936 at the Basin Reserve in Wellington.

By 2015, New Zealand had only won 13 games out of the 64 times the two teams met.

Women's
The Australian Women's Soccer Association (AWSA) was founded in 1974 while a New Zealand women's national team was formed the year after when they were invited to take part in the 1975 Asian Ladies’ Football Confederation Cup in Hong Kong. (Later recognised as the first Asian Cup). While the two teams would meet at the tournament, with New Zealand beating their Australian rivals 3–2, it wasn't considered the first official meeting between the countries due to the Australian side being a composite of players largely from the St. George-Budapest Club in Sydney. This changed in 2022 when Football Australia recognised the former players as official national team members.

What was considered the first official international match between the women's teams until the change in 2022, was on 6 October 1979 when New Zealand travelled to Australia for a three-match series. The game, played at Seymour Shaw Park, ended in a 2–2 draw. This was followed by a second match at the same venue with New Zealand winning 1–0 before the teams moved to Perry Park in Brisbane for the third game with Australia picking up their first win 1–0 ending the series in a draw.

Governing bodies
The New Zealand Football Association would become officially affiliated with FIFA in 1948, with the Australian Soccer Football Association given FIFA provisional membership in November 1954 and confirmed in June 1956. Both associations, along with Fiji and Papua New Guinea would go on to become the founding members of the Oceania Football Confederation in 1966.

Men's matches

Australia and New Zealand have played 66 official matches. Australia have the better record overall in the fixture, with 42 wins to New Zealand's 13. There have been 11 draws, only two of them goalless. Australia have scored 158 goals to 70 by New Zealand. The record margin of victory in the fixture was Australia's 10–0 win in 1936, while New Zealand's biggest victory was 4–1 in 1923.

Women's matches

Australia and New Zealand have played 53 official matches. Australia have the better record overall in the fixture, with 35 wins to New Zealand's 10. There have been 8 draws, only two of them goalless. Australia have scored 95 goals to 43 by New Zealand. The record margin of victory in the fixture was Australia's 6–0 win in 2007, while New Zealand's biggest victory is 3–0, done twice in 1984 and 1991.

Overall summary

Top scorers

Players in bold are still available for selection.

See also
 Australia national soccer team
 New Zealand national football team
 Australia women's national soccer team
 New Zealand women's national football team
 Australia–New Zealand sporting relations
 List of association football club rivalries in Asia and Oceania
 Australia–New Zealand sports rivalries

References

External links
 The Ultimate New Zealand Soccer website Men's New Zealand record vs. Australia
 The Ultimate New Zealand Soccer website Women's New Zealand record vs. Australia

Australia national soccer team
Australia national soccer team rivalries
New Zealand national football team
Australia–New Zealand sports relations
International association football rivalries
1922 in association football
Sports rivalries in New Zealand